Muhammad Akbar ibn Mir Hajji Muhammad Muqim Arzani was a physician from Persia.

Arzani was a celebrated Sufi physician of the late 17th and early 18th century. He composed many medical treatises, including the Qarabadin-i Qadiri, a pharmacopoeia written as a tribute to Sayyid Abd al-Qadir of Gilan (d. 1165CE) who was the founder of the Sufi order of which Arzani was a member.

Arzani also wrote a handbook of medicine for beginners (Mofarrah al'gholoob), a commentary on the Qanunchah by Jaghmini (a greatly abbreviated version of The Canon of Medicine by Avicenna); Tibb-i Akbari, composed in 1700CE, which was an expanded version of the Arabic treatise Sharh al-asbab wa-al-‘alamat by Burhan al-Din Nafis ibn ‘Iwad al-Kirmani; a Persian treatise on the illnesses occurring during pregnancy and breast-feeding and the diseases of infants; and Mujarrabat-i Akbari, a formulary of compound remedies.

Books
1.Teb Al-Akbar
2.Ta'rif Al-Amraz
3.Mofarah Al-Gholoob
4.Mizan Al-Teb
5.Mojriat Akbari
6.summarization of Teb Al-Anabi
7.Mojriat Hendiat

See also

 List of Iranian scientists

References

Sources

For his life and writings, see:

 C.A. Storey, Persian Literature: A Bio-Bibliographical Survey. Volume II, Part 2: E.Medicine (London: Royal Asiatic Society, 1971), p. 268 no 465
 Fateme Keshavarz, A Descriptive and Analytical Catalogue of Persian Manuscripts in the Library of the Wellcome Institute for the History of Medicine (London: Wellcome Institute for the History of Medicine, 1986), pp 57–58
 Lutz Richter-Bernburg, Persian Medical Manuscripts at the University of California, Los Angeles: A Descriptive Catalogue, Humana Civilitas, vol. 4 (Malibu: Udena Publications, 1978), pp 151–155.
Neil Krishan Aggarwal, Muhammad Akbar Arzānī (–1772): Mughal physician and translator, J Med Biogr May 2012 20:65—68.

18th-century Iranian physicians
Traditional Iranian Medicine